Peter Eggers (born 1980) is a Swedish actor, best known for his starring role in the TV series Anno 1790.

Selected filmography
Evil (2003)
Drowning Ghost (2004)

Selected television
Anno 1790 (2011)
Snabba Cash (TV series) (2021-)

References

External links

1980 births
Living people
Swedish male film actors
Swedish male television actors